Whale Branch Early College High School (usually called "Whale Branch") is a public high school within the Beaufort County School District, located in Seabrook, South Carolina, United States.  The school district is the northernmost district of Beaufort County, and includes the unincorporated communities of Dale, Lobeco, Seabrook, and Sheldon.

Opened in 2010, the facility partners with the nearby Technical College of the Lowcountry, enabling students to earn concurrent college credit for several courses while obtaining high school diplomas.

See also
Beaufort County School District

References

External links

Schools in Beaufort County, South Carolina
Public high schools in South Carolina